An excise, or excise tax, is any duty on manufactured goods that is levied at the moment of manufacture rather than at sale. Excises are often associated with customs duties, which are levied on pre-existing goods when they cross a designated border in a specific direction; customs are levied on goods that become taxable items at the border, while excise is levied on goods that came into existence inland.

An excise is considered an indirect tax, meaning that the producer or seller who pays the levy to the government is expected to try to recover their loss by raising the price paid by the eventual buyer of the goods. Excises are typically imposed in addition to an indirect tax such as a sales tax or value-added tax (VAT). Typically, an excise is distinguished from a sales tax or VAT in three ways:
 an excise is typically a per unit tax, costing a specific amount for a volume or unit of the item purchased, whereas a sales tax or value-added tax is an ad valorem tax and proportional to the price of the goods,
 an excise typically applies to a narrow range of products, and
 an excise is typically heavier, accounting for a higher fraction of the retail price of the targeted products.

Typical examples of excise duties are taxes on gasoline and other fuels and taxes on tobacco and alcohol (sometimes referred to as sin tax).

History and rationale

Excise is derived from the Dutch accijns, which is presumed to come from the Latin accensare, meaning simply "to tax".

Excise was introduced in the mid 17th century under the Puritan regime. In the British Isles, upon the Restoration of the Monarchy, many of the Puritan social restrictions were overturned, but excise was re-introduced, under the Tenures Abolition Act 1660, in lieu of rent, for tenancies of royally-owned land which had not already become socage. Although the affected tenancies were limited in number, the excise was levied more generally; at the time, there was thought to be a rough correspondence between the wealthy manufacturers of affected goods, and the wealthy tenants of royal land.

Excise duties or taxes continued to serve political as well as financial ends. Public safety and health, public morals, environmental protection, and national defense are all rationales for the imposition of an excise. In defense of excises on strong drink, Adam Smith wrote: "It has for some time past been the policy of Great Britain to discourage the consumption of spirituous liquors, on account of their supposed tendency to ruin the health and to corrupt the morals of the common people." Samuel Johnson was less flattering in his 1755 dictionary: 

As a deterrent, excise is typically directed towards three broad categories of harm:
 health risks from abusing toxic substances (thus making it a kind of sumptuary tax); typically this includes tobacco and alcohol
 environmental damage (thus acting as a green tax); this usually includes fossil fuels (such as gasoline)
 socially damaging / morally objectionable activity (thus making it a type of vice tax or sin tax); usually this includes gambling, and can include prostitution (including solicitation and pimping) in places where it is legal

Monies raised through excise may be earmarked for redress of specific social costs commonly associated with the product or service on which it is levied. Tobacco tax revenues, for example, might be spent on government anti-smoking campaigns, or healthcare for cancer, heart disease, vascular disease, lung disease, and so on.

In some countries, excise is also levied on some goods for purely punitive reasons. Many US states impose excise on illegal substances; these places do not consider it to be a revenue source, but instead regard it as a means of imposing a greater level of punishment, by opening up convicted criminals to the charge of tax evasion.

Theoretical foundations on specific taxation
The economic analysis of excise taxes has its beginnings with Atkinson and Stiglitz in 1976 stating that if income taxes were optimal there would be no need for specific taxes. But, "if income taxation is not optimal, excise have a role to play, because they are relatively efficient sources of revenue, improve resource allocation
by internalizing the external costs associated with the consumption or production of excisable products, discourage the consumption of products considered harmful, serve as a proxy for charging road users for the cost of government-provided services, or promote progressivity in taxation.".
This is how Sijbren Cnossen sets out five main rationales for the use of excise duties:

1.Revenue-raising efficiency aspects. This is based on the classic argument of the "Ramsey rule". This means that in certain cases it is optimal to differentiate tax rates on consumption according to the price elasticity of each taxed good or service.

2.Externality-correcting issues. These are surcharges for the cost that consumers or producers of certain goods impose on society as a whole but which is not reflected in the price. In other words, there is a negative externality and, therefore, there must be a special tax that tries to correct it. Economically it means that "the marginal cost of an individual consumer or producer's action is less than the marginal cost of his action to society and, as a result, the individual engages in more of the activity than is socially optimal". It has its basis in Pigou's theory where the imposition of a special tax on activity equal to the marginal cost of the harm caused to others would correct the negative externality.

3. Information failures and internality-correcting arguments. This refers to the fact that the lack of information or education about the consumption of certain harmful products has to be corrected by state intervention through the implementation of specific taxes. This is, for example, the case for alcohol, tobacco or sugary products. Because of the damage they cause to health and the illnesses they generate in people, it is decided to tax them specifically.

4. Benefit-charging features. This refers to specific taxes derived from the use of public infrastructures to cover the costs of their construction and maintenance. The clearest example is that of roads, where we find the consumption of road infrastructure, the environmental costs of its use, congestion costs referring to the cost of the added time imposed on drivers and the costs of accidents. This will be financed by specific taxes such as vehicle licensing, road tax, fuel taxes, etc.

5.Progressivity-enhancing aspects. Excise duties on high-value products, i.e. luxury goods, are included. In this way, the consumption of certain products that are only within the reach of high incomes is taxed, thus reinforcing a progressive tax system based on their consumption

Targets of taxation

Tobacco, alcohol and gasoline

These are the three main targets of excise taxation in most countries around the world. They are everyday items of mass usage (even, arguably, "necessity") which bring significant revenue for governments. The first two are considered to be legal drugs, which are a cause of many illnesses (e.g. lung cancer, cirrhosis of the liver), which are used by large swathes of the population, both being widely recognized as addictive. Gasoline (or petrol), as well as diesel and certain other fuels, meanwhile, have excise tax imposed on them mainly because they pollute the environment and to raise funds to support the transportation infrastructure.

Cannabis 

Following the legalization of non-medical cannabis in the United States, states with implemented legal markets have imposed new excise taxes on sales of cannabis products. These taxes have been used to build support for legalization initiatives by raising revenue for general spending purposes.

Narcotics 
Some U.S. states tax transactions involving illegal drugs.

Gambling 
Gambling licences are subject to excise in many countries today. In 18th-century England, and for a brief time in British North America, gambling itself was for a time also subject to taxation, in the form of stamp duty, whereby a revenue stamp had to be placed on the ace of spades in every pack of cards to demonstrate that the duty had been paid (hence the elaborate designs that evolved on this card in many packs as a result). Since stamp duty was originally only meant to be applied to documents (and cards were categorized as such), the fact that dice were also subject to stamp duty (and were in fact the only non-paper item listed under the Stamp Act 1765) suggests that its implementation to cards and dice can be viewed as a type of excise duty on gambling.

Profits of bookmakers are subject to General Betting Duty in the United Kingdom.

Prostitution 
Prostitution has been proposed to bear excise tax in separate bills in the Canadian Parliament (2005), and in the Nevada Legislature (2009) – proposed wordings:
 "5.5 Implementation of an excise tax on prostitution, the brothel is taxed and passed it on." (Canada)
 "An excise tax is hereby imposed on each patron who uses the prostitution services of a prostitute in the amount of $5 for each calendar day or portion thereof that the patron uses the prostitution services of that prostitute." (Nevada)

Unhealthy products 
Excise taxes on unhealthy products include specific taxes on calorie-dense and nutrient-poor food products that are harmful to health. As with environmental taxes, they are not intended to raise revenue but to modify consumer behaviour towards the consumption of food products that are healthy for human health. These include the taxation of specific products such as fast food or high-sugar beverages. 
For example, the World Health Organisation has indicated that the tax on sugary drinks would have to be at least 20% for this measure to have a real impact on obesity and cardiovascular disease. Countries that already have specific taxes on sugary drinks include Norway, Hungary, Finland and France.
The introduction of these special taxes on unhealthy products not only has a short-term impact in terms of reducing consumption, but it is considered that in the long term it will also have positive effects on the welfare state of countries with public health. In other words, if society improves its consumption habits, it will be healthier in the future and diseases resulting from the consumption of unhealthy products will be prevented. This will reduce the need for medical services, which are financed by the state and therefore mean lower health care costs for governments.

Environmentally harmful products 
In recent years, the creation or increase of excise taxes on certain existing consumer products whose production leads to environmental damage is being considered. The declaration of a climate emergency by international organisations such as the UN and the OECD warns that the current production model is and will have negative effects on life on the planet due to the current high level of pollution. 
This is why one way to internalise the negative externality derived from productive activity is the inclusion of special taxes on certain products that are the main cause. These include energy, hydrocarbons and certain means of transport. The aim is to reduce their consumption while at the same time generating revenue to mitigate the negative effects of their consumption. They are therefore excise taxes that serve purposes other than simply to raise revenue.

Other types

Salt, paper and coffee

One of the most notorious taxes in the whole of history was France's gabelle of salt. Although that was a sales tax, rather than an excise, salt has been subject to excise in some countries, along with many other substances which would, in today's world, seem rather unusual, such as paper, and coffee. In fact, salt was taxed as early as the second century, and as late as the twentieth.

Many different reasons have been given for the taxation of such substances, but have usually – if not explicitly – revolved around the historical scarcity of the substance, and their correspondingly high value at the time; governments clearly felt entitled to a share of the profits that traders made on them.

Window and related tax
Window tax was introduced as a form of income tax, that technically preserved the financial privacy of the individual, the rationale being that wealthier individuals would have grander homes, and hence would have more windows. Furthermore, unlike income, windows cannot be easily hidden. Taxes on the same principle include hearth tax, brick tax, and wallpaper tax. Excise is levied at the point of manufacture; in the case of hearth tax, and window tax, their status as excise therefore depends on whether the window/hearth can philosophically be said to truly exist before the hearth/window is installed in the property. Though technically excise, these taxes are really just substitutes for direct taxes, rather than being levied for the usual reasons for excise.

All of these taxes lead to avoidance behaviour that had a substantial impact on society and architecture. People deliberately bricked up windows to avoid window tax, used much larger bricks to reduce their liability for brick tax, or bought plain paper and had it filled in later to avoid wallpaper tax. Some poor people even forced themselves to live in cold dark rooms in order to avoid paying these taxes. By contrast, extremely wealthy individuals would sometimes parade their ability to pay the tax, as a way of showing off their wealth, by flooding their properties with windows—even to the point of installing fake ones—using fine brickwork, covering their interiors with wallpaper, and having several fireplaces in each room.

Newspapers and advertising
Newspapers were taxed in the United Kingdom from 1712 until 1853. The original tax was increased with the Stamps Act 1814, when it was stipulated at 4d per copy. Since this made it extremely expensive for working-class families (doubling the price of a newspaper), it was pejoratively referred to as a "tax on knowledge", with people forced to rent newspapers on a per-hour basis, or else pool money together in order to buy and share. This resulted in a situation where even out-of-date newspapers were widely sought-after.

Advertisement Duty was also stipulated in the same laws and was also charged on a "per unit" basis, irrespective of the size or nature of the advertisement. Until 1833 the cost was 3s 6d, after which it was reduced to 1s 6d.

Machinery of implementation 

An excise duty is often applied by the affixation of revenue stamps to the products being sold. In the case of tobacco or alcohol, for example, producers may be given (or required to buy) a certain bulk amount of excise stamps from the government and are then obliged to affix one to every packet of cigarettes or bottle of spirits produced.

One of the most noticeable examples of this is the development of the Ace of Spades as a particularly elaborate card, from the time when it was obliged to carry the stamp for playing card duty.

A government-owned monopoly - such as an alcohol monopoly - is another method of ensuring the excise is paid.

Around the world

Australia

The Australian Taxation Office describes an excise as "a tax levied on certain types of goods produced or manufactured in Australia. These... include alcohol, tobacco and petroleum and alternative fuels".

In Australia, the meaning of "excise" is not merely academic, but has been the subject of numerous court cases. The High Court of Australia has repeatedly held that a tax can be an "excise" regardless of whether the taxed goods are of domestic or foreign origin; most recently, in Ha v New South Wales (1997), the majority of the Court endorsed the view that an excise is "an inland tax on a step in production, manufacture, sale or distribution of goods", and took a wide view of the kind of "step" which, if subject to a tax, would make the tax an excise.

Canada

Both the federal and provincial governments impose excise taxes on inelastic goods such as cigarettes, gasoline, alcohol, and for vehicle air conditioners. A great bulk of the retail price of cigarettes and alcohol are excise taxes. The vehicle air conditioner tax is currently set at $100 per air conditioning unit. Canada has some of the highest rates of taxes on cigarettes and alcohol in the world. These are sometimes referred to as sin taxes.

Germany 

In Germany, the following excise is charged:
 energy:
 gasoline: €0.6545 /l (c. €0.073 /kWh)
 diesel: €0.4704 /l (c. €0.047 /kWh)
 LPG: €0.166 /kg (c. €0.0896 /l or €0.0129 /kWh)
 CNG: €0.1803 /kg (c. €0.0139 /kWh)
 heating oil: €0.13 /kg (c. €0.0119 /kWh)
 electricity:
 default: €0.0205 /kWh
 for trains, trams, etc.: €0.01142 /kWh
 nuclear fuel:
 €145 /g
 intermediate products in production of alcoholic beverages:
 default: €1.53 /l
 alcoholic contents < 15%: €1.02 /l
 intermediate products in champagne production: €1.36 /l
 tobacco:
 cigarettes: €0.0982 /cigarette + 21.69% of the retail price
 pipe tobacco: €15.66 /kg + 13.13% of the gross price
 cigars: €0.014 /cigar + 1.47% of the gross price
 coffee:
 roasted: €2.19 /kg
 instant: €4.78 /kg
 beer: c. €0.094 /l, depends on the type of beer
 spirits
 champagne:
 alcoholic contents < 6%: €0.51 /l
 alcoholic contents >= 6%: €1.36 /l
 alcopops: €0.0555 /l pure alcohol

India

In India, almost all products are subject to excise duty, provided the following four conditions are fulfilled:
There should be a manufacture
The manufacture was in India (excluding special economic zone)
The manufacture should result in goods
The goods thus manufactured must be excisable (means the goods must be specified in central excise tariff act, 1985)

In India, the Government has produced an automatic centralised system for paying excise. With this, manufacturers can easily pay their excise online on every 5th of the following month through GAR-7.

United Kingdom

In the United Kingdom, the following forms of excise are levied on goods and services:
 Air Passenger Duty (Finance Act 1994)
 Aggregates Levy (Finance Act 2001)
 Alcohol duties (Beer Duty, Wine Duty, Cider Duty, Spirits Duty) (Alcoholic Liquor Duties Act 1979)
 Bingo Duty (Betting and Gaming Duties Act 1981)
 Climate Change Levy (Finance Act 2000)
 Gambling duties (General Betting Duty, Pool Betting Duty, Remote Gaming Duty) (Finance Act 2014)
 HGV Road User Levy (HGV Road User Levy Act 2013)
 Hydrocarbon Oil Duty (Hydrocarbon Oil Duties Act 1979)
 Landfill tax (Finance Act 1996)
 Machine Games Duty (Finance Act 2012) (formerly Amusement Machine Licence Duty)
 Tobacco Duty (Tobacco Products Duty Act 1979)
 Vehicle Excise Duty (Vehicle Excise and Registration Act 1994)

Historically, these were collected by the Board of Excise, which was subsequently combined with the Inland Revenue (responsible for collecting direct taxes). In view of the higher likelihood of organised crime being involved in attempts at evading Excise, and its association with smuggling, compared with evasion attempts concerning direct taxation, the Board of Excise was later combined instead with the Board of Customs, to form HM Customs and Excise. In this combined form, Customs and Excise was responsible for managing the import and export of goods and services into the UK, and its officers wielded greater powers of access, arrest, and seizure, than the Police.

On 18 April 2005, Customs and Excise was merged once more with the Inland Revenue to form a new department, HM Revenue and Customs (HMRC). The enormous contrast between the powers of officers of the Inland Revenue, and those of Customs and Excise, initially caused several difficulties in the early life of the new organisation. Many of the monitoring and inspection functions, and corresponding powers, were later split off to form a new UK Border Agency, while the residual organisation is now merely responsible for the financial aspects of collection.

United States

In the United States, the term "excise" has at least two meanings: (A) any tax other than a property tax or capitation (i.e., an excise is an indirect tax in the constitutional law sense), or (B) a tax that is simply called an excise in the language of the statute imposing that tax (an excise in the statutory law sense, sometimes called a "miscellaneous excise"). An excise under definition (A) is not necessarily the same as an excise under definition (B).

An excise (under definition B) has been defined as '"a tax upon manufacture, sale or for a business license or charter, as distinguished from a tax on real property, income or estates."

Both the federal and state governments levy excise taxes on goods such as alcohol, motor fuel, and tobacco products. The laws of the federal government and of some state governments impose excises known as the income tax. Even though federal excise taxes are geographically uniform, state excise taxes vary considerably. Taxation constitutes a substantial proportion of the retail prices on alcohol and tobacco products.

Local governments may also impose an excise tax. For example, the city of Anchorage, Alaska charges a cigarette tax of $1.30 per pack, which is on top of the federal excise tax and the state excise tax. In 2011, the United States federal excise tax on gasoline was 18.4 cents per gallon (4.86 ¢/L) and 24.4 cents per gallon (6.45 ¢/L) for diesel fuel.

European Union
In the European Union, harmonisation of excise duties has been considered from the outset. However, the first obstacle was the great heterogeneity of these taxes in the different Member States. 
Thus, in 1972, excise duties on mineral fuels and oils, alcohol and alcohol derivatives, fermented beverages and manufactured tobacco were harmonised. Due to the differences between countries and the impossibility of reaching an agreement whereby the tax would be fixed and the same for all member countries, it was decided to intervene in excise duties in two ways. The first by establishing a minimum tax rate equal for all member countries and, secondly, by establishing a long-term objective to which all member countries should converge.
According to Eurostat data from 2014, it is known that energy taxes represent on average 16% of the implicit rate on consumption and up to 50% of excise tax revenue. Alcohol and tobacco account for only 8% of the implicit rate on consumption. As a whole, excise duties account for around 3% of GDP as a weighted average for the countries that make up the European Union.

Criticisms 
Critics of excise have interpreted and described it as simply being a way for government to levy further and unnecessary taxation on the population. The presence of refunds of duty under the UK's list of excisable activities has been used to support this argument, as it results in taxation being implemented on persons even when they would normally be exempt from paying other types of taxes (the reason they qualify for the refund in the first place).

Furthermore, excise sometimes doubles up with other taxes, and in particular with customs duties (except, for duty-free items). If a good is purchased in one country and later exported to another, excise must be paid when it was manufactured, and customs then paid when it enters the second country; in a sense, the "creation" of the good has been taxed twice, although from the second country's point of view, it only came into existence as a taxable good at the border. 

In some countries, such as the UK, excise has generally been limited to goods which are luxuries or a risk to health or morals, but this is not the case everywhere. Taxation on medicines, pharmaceuticals and medical equipment has been an issue of contention, especially in developing countries, due to the fact that this can cause the prices of medicines, and medical procedures, to become inflated, even when potentially lifesaving; this has sometimes forced healthcare providers to limit the number of operations performed.

In some countries, goods which are illegal are nevertheless also subject to excise, and the ground of tax evasion has subsequently been used to prosecute criminal gang leaders, when it has not been possible to prosecute the criminal activity more directly. It has also been argued that, by taxing banned substances, some US states are able to gain additional revenues. In some cases, legislation creates an incentive for the state to turn a blind eye to certain criminal activity, by allowing dealers to preserve their anonymity, and thus enabling revenue to be collected without leading to the arrest of the perpetrator:

See also 
 Customs
 Securities turnover excise tax

References

External links

 
Tax terms